The Kingsway School is a coeducational secondary school located in Stockport, Greater Manchester, England.

The school has sites on each side of Kingsway; on Foxland Road in Gatley to the west and Broadway in Cheadle to the east.

History 
The school was formed in 1983 by the merger of Broadway Boys School and Kingsway Girls School, now called the Foxland and Broadway campuses after the roads they are on. In 2014, the school celebrated the 75th anniversary of Broadway Campus and the 50th anniversary of the Foxland Campus.

Previously a community school administered by Stockport Metropolitan Borough Council, in February 2016 The Kingsway School converted to academy status. The school is now sponsored by the Education Learning Trust.

Charitable activity 
The school has raised over £500,000 for charities including their sister school in Kenya.
This has been done through a sponsored walk every other year, an annual Christmas fair along with several other charity events. Staff from both schools often visit the other to share experiences and knowledge as well as support each other in the teaching of future generations.

Notable former pupils 
Simon Gregson, actor
Nicholas Cochrane, actor
Oliver Cookson, entrepreneur
Ryan Thomas, actor
Adam Thomas, actor
Hallam Hope, footballer
George Evans,   footballer

References 

Secondary schools in the Metropolitan Borough of Stockport
Academies in the Metropolitan Borough of Stockport
Cheadle, Greater Manchester
Educational institutions established in 1983